Heliconia berryi is a species of plant in the family Heliconiaceae. It is endemic to Ecuador.  Its natural habitat is subtropical or tropical moist montane forest.

References

Flora of Ecuador
berryi
Vulnerable plants
Taxonomy articles created by Polbot